The Fagen Fighters WWII Museum is an aviation museum located in Granite Falls, Minnesota. The museum is made up of three display hangars, a restoration hangar, a reproduction Quonset hut, and a reproduction control tower.

History 
The origins of the museum lie in the establishment of Fagen Fighters Restoration in 1998. However, the museum itself was only founded in 2012.

In 2017, the museum purchased a collection of spare parts that belonged to Jay Wisler.

Collection 

 Curtiss P-40 Warhawk
 Curtiss SB2C-5 Helldiver
 Eastern FM-2 Wildcat
 Fairchild PT-19
 Fairchild PT-26
 Grumman F6F-5 Hellcat
 Lockheed P-38 Lightning
 Mitsubishi A6M3 Zero
 North American B-25 Mitchell
 North American P-51 Mustang
 Ryan PT-22 Recruit
 Vultee BT-13 Valiant
 Waco CG-4A

See also 
 American Wings Air Museum
 Dakota Territory Air Museum
 Fargo Air Museum
 List of aviation museums
 Wings of the North Air Museum

References

External links 

 
 Fagen Fighter Restoration

2012 establishments in Minnesota
Aerospace museums in Minnesota
Museums in Yellow Medicine County, Minnesota
Museums established in 2012
Military and war museums in Minnesota